Moggridgea is a genus of spiders in the tree dwelling family, Migidae.
The genus was first described by Octavius Pickard-Cambridge in 1875, who named the genus after naturalist John Traherne Moggridge.

The majority of the 32 species of the genus are found in southern Africa and Socotra, with an outlying species in Australia's Kangaroo Island.

List of Moggridgea species
 Moggridgea albimaculata Hewitt, 1925 (South Africa)
 Moggridgea ampullata Griswold, 1987 (South Africa)
 Moggridgea anactenidia Griswold, 1987 (Cameroon)
 Moggridgea breyeri Hewitt, 1915 (South Africa)
 Moggridgea clypeostriata Benoit, 1962 (Congo)
 Moggridgea crudeni Hewitt, 1913 (South Africa)
 Moggridgea dyeri O. P.-Cambridge, 1875 (South Africa)
 Moggridgea eremicola Griswold, 1987 (Namibia)
 Moggridgea intermedia Hewitt, 1913 (South Africa)
 Moggridgea leipoldti Purcell, 1903 (South Africa)
 Moggridgea loistata Griswold, 1987 (South Africa)
 Moggridgea microps Hewitt, 1915 (South Africa)
 Moggridgea mordax Purcell, 1903 (South Africa)
 Moggridgea nesiota Griswold, 1987 (Comoro Is.)
 Moggridgea occidua Simon, 1907 (Principe)
 Moggridgea pallida Hewitt, 1914 (Namibia)
 Moggridgea paucispina Hewitt, 1916 (South Africa)
 Moggridgea peringueyi Simon, 1903 (South Africa)
 Moggridgea pseudocrudeni Hewitt, 1919 (South Africa)
 Moggridgea purpurea Lawrence, 1928 (Namibia)
 Moggridgea pymi Hewitt, 1914 (Zimbabwe, South Africa)
 Moggridgea quercina Simon, 1903 (South Africa)
 Moggridgea rainbowi Pulleine, 1919 (Kangaroo Island, South Australia)
 Moggridgea rupicola Hewitt, 1913 (South Africa)
 Moggridgea rupicoloides Hewitt, 1914 (South Africa)
 Moggridgea socotra Griswold, 1987 (Socotra)
 Moggridgea tanypalpa Griswold, 1987 (Angola)
 Moggridgea teresae Griswold, 1987 (South Africa)
 Moggridgea terrestris Hewitt, 1914 (South Africa)
 Moggridgea terricola Simon, 1903 (South Africa)
 Moggridgea verruculata Griswold, 1987 (Congo)
 Moggridgea whytei Pocock, 1897 (Central Africa)

References
  (2008): The world spider catalog, version 8.5. American Museum of Natural History.
Main, B.Y. 1991. Occurrence of the trapdoor spider genus Moggridgea in Australia with descriptions of two new species (Araneae: Mygalomorphae: Migidae). Journal of Natural History 25: 383-397 [385].

Migidae
Mygalomorphae genera
Spiders of Africa
Spiders of Australia